Monique Jones (born March 12, 1979) is an American professional female bodybuilder.

Figure career

Amateur
At the age of 16, Monique has been involved in a fitness environment since she purchased her first gym membership.  One day she was approached by a trainer who saw potential in her trying a competitive level sport.  She then took upon herself to prepare for her first figure show.  She competed in the SNBF show in Spartanburg, South Carolina in 2001, which she placed 1st in the overall.  In 2007, during her trip to nationals in Charleston, South Carolina, she was approached by the judges who told her she should crossover into bodybuilding, which she accepted.

Contest history
 2001 SNBF – 1st (overall)
 2005 NPC South Carolina State – 1st (class C)
 2005 NPC Excalibur – South Carolina – 1st (overall and tall)
 2005 NPC Coastal USA Championships – 1st (class D)
 2006 NPC Junior USA – 14th (class  D)
 2007 OCB Yorton Cup Nationals – 1st (short and overall)
 2007 NPC East Coast Tournament of Champions – 4th (class A and masters)
 2008 NPC USA Championships (figure C) – DNP
 2009 NPC Great Lakes Grand Prix – 2nd (masters); 3rd (class A)

Bodybuilding career

Amateur
In 2008, Jones competed in her first bodybuilding competition at the South Carolina State show in Columbia, South Carolina, where she won the overall in women's bodybuilding. At the national realm, she placed 2nd or 3rd for her first three national showings. After placing first in the 2010 IFBB North American Championships, she won her IFBB Pro card.

Professional

Since 2011, she has qualified for every Ms. Olympia held that year.

Contest history
 2008 NPC South Carolina State – 1st (HW and overall)
 2008 NPC Nationals – 3rd (HW)
 2008 Junior Nationals – 2nd (HW)
 2009 IFBB North American Championships – 3rd (HW)
 2009 NPC Nationals – 3rd (HW)
 2010 IFBB North American Championships – 1st (HW and overall)
 2011 IFBB Pro Bodybuilding Weekly Championships – 5th
 2011 IFBB Ms. Olympia – 9th
 2011 IFBB Europa Battle of Champions – 2nd
 2012 IFBB Ms. International – 10th
 2012 IFBB Europa Battle of Champions – 3rd
 2012 IFBB WOS Chicago Pro-Am Extravaganza – 1st
 2012 IFBB Ms. Olympia – 7th
 2013 IFBB WOS Chicago Pro-Am Extravaganza – 1st
 2013 IFBB Ms. Olympia – 8th
 2014 IFBB Tampa Pro – 3rd
 2015 IFBB Omaha Pro – 2nd
 2015 IFBB Pro League WOS Rising Phoenix Pro Women's Bodybuilding – 13th
 2018 IFBB WOS Romania Muscle Fest Pro Women's Bodybuilding – 1st
 2019 IFBB Pro League WOS Rising Phoenix Pro Women's Bodybuilding – 5th
 2020 IFBB Pro League WOS Rising Phoenix Pro Women's Bodybuilding - 3rd
 2020 IFBB WOS Ms. Olympia - 6th

Personal life
Monique currently lives in Greenville, South Carolina. She is a Christian. She is a NPC judge and contest prep coach, Her trainer is Johnny Stewart. She was homeschooled as a child. She has a daughter. Her sponsor company is Species Nutrition.

References

1979 births
African-American Christians
African-American female bodybuilders
Living people
People from Bullitt County, Kentucky
People from Hardin County, Kentucky
People from Greer, South Carolina
People from Meade County, Kentucky
People from Nelson County, Kentucky
Professional bodybuilders
Sportspeople from Greenville, South Carolina
Sportspeople from Kentucky
Sportspeople from South Carolina
21st-century African-American sportspeople
21st-century African-American women
20th-century African-American sportspeople
20th-century African-American women
20th-century African-American people